El Dorado High School may refer to one of several high schools in the United States:

El Dorado High School (Arizona)  — Chandler, Arizona
El Dorado High School (Arkansas)  — El Dorado, Arkansas
Eldorado Emerson Private School – Orange, California
El Dorado High School (Placentia, California)  — Placentia, California
El Dorado High School (Placerville, California)  — Placerville, California
El Dorado High School (Kansas)  — El Dorado, Kansas
El Dorado High School (New Mexico)  — Albuquerque, New Mexico 
El Dorado High School (El Paso, Texas)  — El Paso, Texas
El Dorado Springs High School — El Dorado Springs, Missouri